Consistent eschatology (Thoroughgoing eschatology) is a theory in theological and biblical studies that interprets Jesus "in exclusively eschatological terms". The view was initiated by  Johannes Weiss, and "picked up, developed, and popularized" by Albert Schweitzer.
It is an exclusive futuristic eschatology, the consistent interpretation of Jesus' eschatology as an expectation of an imminent end, and the thorough-going eschatology,  the first position by Albert Schweitzer. He used a thorough eschatology to provide a solution to the historical problems associated with Jesus' life. According to this view, asserted by Johannes Weiss (J. Weiß),  the proclamation of Jesus, his actions and ministry are dominated by the eschatological expectation of the impending return. (For example, "the kingdom of God is at hand” (Mk. 1:15).)

It has been described by  one critic (George Eldon Ladd) as picturing 
Jesus as a deluded Jewish apocalyptist who proclaimed an eschatological kingdom which never came and which never can come. Jesus had no message about the rule of God in the world or his divine purpose for mankind in history. He believed, mistakenly, that God was about to break off history and establish his eschatological kingdom in which he, Jesus, would be elevated to the glorious status of the Son of Man.

As a futuristic eschatology, it is in contrast to "realized eschatology", which sees the kingdom of God as not in the future but already completed in the ministry of Jesus Christ, (realized eschatology explaining the lack of apocalyptic upheaval and conquering Kingdom of God that Jesus's followers had been expecting). It has evolved into inaugurated eschatology which started the synthesis of the consistent eschatology by Albert Schweitzer and realized eschatology by C. H. Dodd.

See also
 Jesuism
 Postmillennialism
 World to Come
Inaugurated eschatology
Christian eschatology
Idealism (Christian eschatology)
Kingdom theology
Realized eschatology

Books
 George Eldon Ladd (1959). The Gospel of the Kingdom: Scriptural Studies in the Kingdom of God. Wm. B. Eerdmans Publishing. .
 Albert Schweitzer, The Mystery of the Kingdom of God: The Secret of Jesus' Messiahship and Passion. (1914), Prometheus Books. 1985.

References

Christian eschatology
Christian terminology